disambiguation: Love suicide 

"Love Suicide" is a song by British rapper Tinie Tempah, featuring vocals from singer-songwriter Ester Dean. The song was produced by Norwegian production team Stargate. In some areas of Europe, the track was used as the official theme for the KS Media adverts, a television production company who used the track for certain advertisements.

Track listing
 Digital download
 "Love Suicide" - 4:07

Chart performance

Release history

References

2010 songs
Tinie Tempah songs
Songs written by Espen Lind
Songs written by Amund Bjørklund
Songs written by Mikkel Storleer Eriksen
Songs written by Tor Erik Hermansen
Song recordings produced by Stargate (record producers)
Songs written by Ester Dean